The Base may refer to:

 The Base (film), a 1999 action thriller film
 The Base (hate group), an accelerationist, neo-Nazi white separatist paramilitary hate group
 De Basis (The Base), a political party in the Netherlands, formerly known as the Basic Income Party
 The Base (Sardinian political party), a political party in Sardinia, Italy
 The Base (shopping centre), a regional shopping centre located in Te Rapa
 Al-Qaeda (Arabic for "the Base"), a militant Salafist Islamist multi-national organization

See also
 Base (disambiguation)